Gympie is an electoral district of the Legislative Assembly in the Australian state of Queensland The electorate is centred on the city of Gympie and stretches north to Rainbow Beach and as far south to Pomona.

The seat is currently held by Tony Perrett of the Liberal National Party.

The district's most famous former member is Andrew Fisher, who later became Prime Minister of Australia.

Members for Gympie

Election results

References

External links
 

Gympie